Bautz is a surname. Notable people with this surname include:
 (born 1972), German biologist and activist
Ekkehard Bautz (born 1933), German molecular biologist
Erich Bautz (1913–1986), German racing cyclist
Friedrich Wilhelm Bautz (1906–1979), German theologian
 (1843–1917), German Catholic priest
Laura P. Bautz (1940–2014), also known as Pat Bautz, American astronomer, namesake of Bautz–Morgan classification
Pat Bautz, American rock musician, drummer for Three Dog Night